Centre Avenue or Center Avenue may refer to:
 Centre Avenue station, a Long Island Rail Road station in East Rockaway, New York, U.S.
 Centre Avenue (Pittsburgh), Pennsylvania, U.S.
 Center Avenue Neighborhood Residential District, Bay City, Michigan, U.S.